Suchdol nad Lužnicí is a town in Jindřichův Hradec District in the South Bohemian Region of the Czech Republic. It has about 3,500 inhabitants.

Administrative parts
Villages of Bor, Františkov, Hrdlořezy, Klikov and Tušť are administrative parts of Suchdol nad Lužnicí.

Geography
It lies in the Třeboň Basin and in the Třeboňsko Protected Landscape Area. The town is situated on the Lužnice River. There are several ponds and flooded quarries in the municipal territory.

History
The first written mention of Suchdol nad Lužnicí is from 1362, when it was bought by the Rosenberg family and joined to the Třeboň estate. The last member of the Rosenberg family died in 1611 and Suchdol was then inherited by the Schwamberg family. After the Battle of White Mountain (1620), properties of the Schwambergs were confiscated by Ferdinand II. The village was owned by the House of Habsburg until 1660, when it was bought by the House of Schwarzenberg.

In 1876, the village was promoted to a market town. In 2005, Suchdol nad Lužnicí became a town.

Demographics

Sights
The landmark of the town is the Church of Saint Nicholas. It was built in the Gothic style in 1363. The second monument is the Chapel of Saint John of Nepomuk from 1728.

Twin towns – sister cities

Suchdol nad Lužnicí is twinned with:
 Brand-Nagelberg, Austria

References

External links

Cities and towns in the Czech Republic
Populated places in Jindřichův Hradec District